Robert Hill may refer to:

Politicians
Robert Hill (died 1423) (c. 1361–1423), Member of Parliament (MP) for Somerset
Robert Hill (died 1426) (before 1350–c. 1426), English politician and judge
Robert Hill (died 1444) of Shilston, son of the judge, and Sheriff of Devon in 1428
Robert Hill (Australian politician) (born 1946), former Australian Senator, Defence Minister and Ambassador to the United Nations
Robert P. Hill (1874–1937), American politician, U.S. Representative from Illinois and Oklahoma
Robert M. Hill Jr. (born 1932), American politician in the Alabama House of Representatives

Sports
 Robert Hill (coach) (c. 1934–2016), American football and baseball coach
 Bob Hill (born 1948), American basketball coach, also referred to as Robert W. Hill
 Rob Hill (field hockey) (born 1967), British field hockey player
 Rob Hill (pool player), 2003 EUKPF World Champion
 Robert Hill (cricketer) (born 1954), New Zealand cricketer

Music
Rob Hill (producer), music producer and engineer
Robert Hill (musician) (born 1953), American harpsichordist and fortepianist

Judges
Robert Andrews Hill (1811–1900), U.S. federal judge
Robert Madden Hill (1928–1987), U.S. federal judge

Others
Robert A. Hill (historian) (born 1943), Jamaican historian and Marcus Garvey scholar
Robert B. Hill (born 1938), American sociologist
Robert C. Hill (1917–1978), American diplomat
Robert Chambre Hill (1778–1860), British Army officer of the Napoleonic War era
Robert F. Hill (1886–1966), Canadian director, screenwriter, and actor during the silent film era
Robert Gardiner Hill (1811–1878), British surgeon specialising in treatment of the insane
Robert J. Hill (died 1953), American draftsman, designer, and art director
Robert Lee Hill (1892–1963), American sharecropper and trade unionist
Robert L. Hill (biochemist) (1928–2012), American biochemist
Robert T. Hill (1858–1941), Texas geologist
Robert W. Hill (1828–1909), American architect
Robert Hill (priest) (died 1623), English clergyman, a "conforming puritan" according to Anthony Milton
Robert Hill (entertainer) (died 2009), entertainer shot dead by the Jamaica Constabulary Force
Robert Hill (writer), American writer
Robert Jordan Hill, British director, writer, editor and producer
Robert Wylie Hill (1851–1939), Scottish importer and retailer

See also
Bobby Hill (disambiguation)
Robert Hull (disambiguation)
Robin Hill (biochemist) (1899–1991), also known as Robert Hill, British biochemist
Robert Hill Hanna (1887–1967), Irish-born Canadian recipient of the Victoria Cross